The Equestrian competition at the 2014 Central American and Caribbean Games was held in Veracruz, Mexico.

The tournament was scheduled to be held from 15–29 November at the Coapexpan Equestrian Club.

Medal summary

Dressage

Eventing

Jumping

Medal table

References

External links
Official Website

2014 Central American and Caribbean Games events
2014 in equestrian
Qualification tournaments for the 2015 Pan American Games
Equestrian at the Central American and Caribbean Games
Equestrian sports competitions in Mexico